Gundars Daudze (born May 9, 1965, Riga) is a Latvian physician and politician, Speaker of the 9th Saeima (parliament) of Latvia (2007-2010). He is a member of the For Latvia and Ventspils party, which participates in national elections as a member of the Union of Greens and Farmers list.

References

1965 births
Living people
Politicians from Riga
For Latvia and Ventspils politicians
Speakers of the Saeima
Deputies of the 9th Saeima
Deputies of the 10th Saeima
Deputies of the 12th Saeima
Deputies of the 13th Saeima
Deputies of the 14th Saeima
Riga Stradiņš University alumni
Recipients of the Order of the Cross of Terra Mariana, 2nd Class
Commanders of the Order of Merit of the Republic of Poland